Ercüment Ergün (born 1973), better known as Erci E, is a Turkish-German rapper. His parents were Turkish immigrant workers. He is best known for his work with the pioneering Turkish rap group Cartel in 1995.

References

External links 

German rappers
Turkish rappers
German people of Turkish descent
Living people
1973 births
Musicians from Berlin